Christoph Kaulich (born 11 October 1994) is a German sport shooter.

He participated at the 2018 ISSF World Shooting Championships, winning a medal.

References

External links

Living people
1994 births
German male sport shooters
ISSF rifle shooters